Cyclocybe parasitica, also known as tawaka in te reo or poplar mushroom, is a species of gilled mushroom in the genus Cyclocybe found mostly in New Zealand and Australia. It grows on native and introduced trees where it can cause heart rot, and does not seem to be associated with conifers.

Description

The cap is centrally attached, buff coloured, and darker at center. Stem is pale with white flesh. Veil is pressing against the gills and turns into a prominent ring often striated with dark brown spore print upon the stem expansion. Spores are cylindrical and thick walled with a prominent germ pore.

Ecology
The species grows parasitically and saprotrophically in hardwood trees such as Beilschmiedia tawa, Hoheria or Plagianthus but can also be found on Nothofagus, birches or poplars. It is native and probably indigenous to New Zealand. Fruiting bodies usually occur in late summer and autumn, sometimes single but usually in clusters.

Uses
Tawaka is an edible mushroom with meaty savoury taste. It can be collected in the wild or cultivated on logs that are inoculated four to eight weeks after cutting and defoliating. According to a study from Lincoln University in 1990, tawaka contains approximately 20% protein in dry mass, which is roughly half of what can be found in the common button mushroom, while the essential amino acid composition is similar. On the other hand, available carbohydrate content is almost three times higher.

Although most commonly known for its culinary value, tawaka was historically used by Māori people as a traditional medicine.

References

External links

 Agrocybe parasitica on the T.E.R.R.A.I.N site 

Strophariaceae
Fungi of Australia
Fungi of New Zealand
Fungi described in 1982
Edible fungi